Gusikha is a rural locality (a village) in Zaborskoye Rural Settlement, Tarnogsky District, Vologda Oblast, Russia. The population was 50 as of 2002.

Geography 
Gusikha is located 28 km west of Tarnogsky Gorodok (the district's administrative centre) by road. Kurevino is the nearest rural locality.

References 

Rural localities in Tarnogsky District